Chilton Avenue–Orchard Parkway Historic District is a national historic district in Niagara Falls in Niagara County, New York.  It encompasses 103 contributing buildings in a residential district built up between about 1899 and 1941. The dominant architectural styles are Queen Anne, Colonial Revival, Tudor Revival, and Bungalow / American Craftsman.

It was listed on the National Register of Historic Places in 2010.

References

Houses on the National Register of Historic Places in New York (state)
Historic districts on the National Register of Historic Places in New York (state)
Queen Anne architecture in New York (state)
Colonial Revival architecture in New York (state)
Tudor Revival architecture in New York (state)
Houses in Niagara County, New York
National Register of Historic Places in Niagara County, New York
2010 establishments in New York (state)